Rice Lane railway station is a railway station in Liverpool, England, located to the north of the city centre in the Walton district.  It is on the Kirkby branch of the Merseyrail network's Northern Line.

The station was opened on 20 November 1848, and was known as Preston Road until 14 May 1984.  It is located just to the north of Walton Junction, where the Kirkby and Ormskirk branches of the Northern line diverge;  station on the Ormskirk line is close by (5 minutes away on foot along Hornby Road).

Facilities
Rice Lane is staffed throughout day, as is the norm for Merseyrail stations (15 minutes before start of service until 00:20, seven days per week). The ticket office is located on the Liverpool-bound platform and there are shelters on each side, along with digital information screens and timetable posters.  Automated train running announcements are also provided.  No step-free access is offered, as the only way to reach the platforms is via a staircase from the road after which the station is named (the two platforms being linked by a stepped footbridge).

Services
Trains operate every 15 minutes between Kirkby and Liverpool Central, and every 30 minutes at other time (evenings after 19:50 and all day Sundays).

Gallery

References

External links

Former Lancashire and Yorkshire Railway stations
Railway stations in Liverpool
DfT Category E stations
Railway stations in Great Britain opened in 1848
Railway stations served by Merseyrail